The 1921 Michigan Mines football team represented the Michigan College of Mines—now known as Michigan Technological University—as an independent during the 1922 college football season. Michigan Mines compiled a 1–1 record.

The team opened the season with a 12–7 victory over Northern Michigan on October 22.

Schedule

References

Michigan Mines
Michigan Tech Huskies football seasons
Michigan Mines football